Stefano Bloch is an American author and professor of cultural geography and critical criminology at the University of Arizona.

Bloch is the author of Going All City: Struggle and Survival in LA's Graffiti Subculture and appears in the documentaries Bomb It and Vigilante Vigilante: The Battle for Expression. Bloch is credited with "changing the conversation about graffiti in LA."

Dr. Stefano Bloch is Associate Professor and Director of Graduate Studies for the University of Arizona School of Geography, Development and Environment in the College of Social and Behavioral Sciences, and faculty member in the Graduate Interdisciplinary Program in Social, Cultural, and Critical Theory.

Dr. Bloch provides expert testimony on legal cases focusing on gang activity and identity.

Education and career 
Bloch was an Andrew W. Mellon Postdoctoral Fellow at the Brown University Cogut Center for the Humanities, and Presidential Diversity Fellow and a Senior Research Associate in the Urban Studies Program at Brown University.

Bloch worked under the preeminent socio-spatial theorist, urbanist, and co-founder of the Los Angeles School, Edward Soja. As a graduate researcher in the Department of Urban Planning within the UCLA Luskin School of Public Affairs,  Bloch collaborated on Dr. Soja's My Los Angeles and Seeking Spatial Justice.

Bloch is a graduate of the University of Minnesota (Ph.D.), UCLA (MA), the University of California, Santa Cruz (BA), and Los Angeles Valley College (AAS).

Bloch is a member of the American Association of Geographers, the American Society of Criminology, the UA Center for Latin American Studies, the Institute for LGBT Studies, and is an executive board member of the Graduate Interdisciplinary Program in Social, Cultural, and Critical Theory at the University of Arizona.

In 2020, Bloch's master seminar "Researching and Writing an Autoethnography of the Street" was convened by Tricia Rose at the Center for the Study of Race and Ethnicity in America at Brown University.

Bloch's writing on gang member identification appeared as an op-ed in The New York Times and his work on police shootings involving pet dogs co-authored with sociologist Daniel E. Martinez appeared in Slate.com.

In 2021, Bloch was awarded an "Early Career Scholars Award" for excellence in research, service, and teaching at the University of Arizona, and was awarded a College of Social and Behavioral Sciences "Excellence in Undergraduate Teaching Award."

Scholarly writing and publications 
Professor Bloch's research on policing, carcerality, race, and displacement has been published in academic journals including Antipode (journal) (2021) with Enrique Alan Olivares-Pelayo, Geography Compass (2021), Critical Criminology (journal) (2020), Progress in Human Geography (2020), in Urban Studies (journal) with anthropologist Susan A. Phillips, and in other scholarly venues.

In a 2018 article published in the Journal of Contemporary Ethnography, Bloch coined the term "place based elicitation" to describe interviewing techniques that allow for reflexive, in-situ expression by members of criminal subcultures.

In a 2019 article on gentrification and gang injunctions in the Echo Park neighborhood of Los Angeles, published in Environment and Planning D: Society & Space, Bloch and co-author D. Meyer coined the term "implicit revanchism".

In 2020, Bloch co-authored with University of Arizona sociologist Daniel E. Martinez, "Canicide by Cop: A geographical analysis of canine killings by police in Los Angeles," published in the journal Geoforum.

In 2021, Bloch published an article in Environment and Planning C: Politics & Space  on the concept of aversive racism – a concept theorized by psychologists Samuel L. Gaertner and John F. Dovidio. A 2021 version of the paper appears as an op-ed for the London School of Economics Phelan Center under the title "How surveillance technologies and neighborhood watch apps are capturing and reflecting communities' prejudices."

In 2021, Bloch won the American Society of Criminology Journal Article of the Year Award for "Broken Windows Ideology and the (Mis)Reading of Graffiti."

Bloch's 2022 article "For Autoethnographies of Displacement Beyond Gentrification: The Body as Archive, Memory as Data" appeared in the Annals of the American Association of Geographers.

In 2022 the Wiley (publisher) journal Geography Compass published Bloch's "Gangs, Gang Members, and Geography."

Praise for Going All City 
Linguist and activist Noam Chomsky hails Going All City as "a vivid autoethnography and a shattering account of life in the LA 'gang hoods – and the warmth and companionship that somehow survive the horrors.'" Writing:

Luis J. Rodriguez, former poet laureate, Chicano activist, and author of Always Running: La Vida Loca, Gang Days in L.A., writes:

Writing for the Los Angeles Review of Books in 2020, Ryan Gattis, author of All Involved" stated:

According to author and cultural criminologist Jeff Ferrell, writing for Times Higher Education:

Chaz Bojorquez, the "god father of Chicano graffiti," calls Stefano Bloch "the first true graffiti writer scholar, tagging his story and name on the walls inside your mind."

Susan A. Phillips, noted anthropologist and author of Wallbangin', Operation Flytrap, and The City Beneath states:

The Minneapolis Star Tribune states that "Stefano Bloch's memoir about growing up in 1990s Los Angeles, is a surprising and intimate look inside the life of a graffiti writer."

According to the Times Literary Supplement in London:

Writing for KCET, Mike Sonksen states:

For Alex S. Vitale, author of The End of Policing:

As written in a featured review of Going All City in the Annals of the American Association of Geographers in 2020:

In Hyperallergic, critic and art historian Bridget Quinn calls Going All City "that rarest text, both a gripping memoir of life on the street, as well as an academic treatise."

Personal life 
As stated in his 2019 memoir, Going All City, Bloch attended North Hollywood High School. Under his pseudonym, Cisco, Bloch is a member of the Los Angeles-based CBS graffiti crew and former writing partner of Mear One.

In a 2021 interview with the Los Angeles Lakers on NBA.com titled "The Streets with Stefano Bloch," Bloch discusses graffiti in LA and the Lakers' impact on the street art scene, crediting the Lakers organization and its players with bringing some sense of unity to an otherwise racially and economically divided city.

As Cisco, Bloch is widely credited as an innovator of 1990s-era graffiti writing styles including "topless letters" and "top-to-bottom freeway silvers," and is known as "one of LA's most prolific (and, in some circles, legendary) graffiti writers" according to Times Higher Education.

Bloch lives with his family in Los Angeles, California and Tucson, Arizona.

Works 
Bloch, Stefano (2019). "Going All City: Struggle and Survival in LA's Graffiti Subculture". Chicago: University of Chicago Press.

References 

Living people
Writers from Los Angeles
Year of birth missing (living people)
American Association of Geographers
American geographers
Human geographers
American graffiti artists
American male non-fiction writers
University of California, Santa Cruz alumni
University of Minnesota alumni
UCLA Luskin School of Public Affairs alumni
Los Angeles Valley College people
University of Arizona faculty
Ethnographers